Giglana is a village situated at  distance from Neemrana in North Direction, Rajasthan, India. This village is covered With two sides by hills.

Villages in Alwar district